Rugby 06 is the 2006 release in the Rugby series by EA Sports.  The game allows players to play as many Rugby nations, both major and minor, and includes many tournaments, such as the Rugby World Cup, the Tri Nations, the Six Nations, and the Super 14.

Features
This game has several new features. Some of the features are for graphical purposes (e.g. new weather effects), and others are for gameplay (e.g. new tackle options and off-load passing options). Some of the features are:

Playable modes
6 Nations, Tri-Nations (with the Bledisloe Cup), Ten Nations, Lions Tour (SA, NZ, Australia), Super 14, Guinness Premiership, World League, World Championship, European Trophy, manager mode

Increased tactical plays
25+ new tactical plays can be chosen by the player.

Off-load passing
When the player's character draws a defender to him, he is able to quickly off-load the ball to a teammate before the defender actually tackles him. This can cause a gap in the defensive line, which can be exploited by the player.

Comprehensive commentary
Ian Robertson returns for this game, next to former All Black great Grant Fox, as well as comments from Murray Mexted.

Impact Players
Impact/Star player, are players that could potentially turn a match in the player's favour. These player are the best in-game in their specialised area. Impact players are highlighted in game with a star above their heads.

Enhanced players and stadium conditions
The game features new stadium animations, such as banner rotations, 3D grass, and team relevant flags. Also the weather conditions are improved, and new conditions are added. The player can now play in snow and fog, and even see the characters' breath in cold weather.

Quick penalties
The game also includes the option of taking a quick penalty, which can help to score a sneaky try or just to gain some metres.

Reception

The PlayStation 2 and Xbox versions received "generally favorable reviews", while the PC version received "average" reviews, according to the review aggregation website Metacritic. In Japan, Famitsu gave the PS2 version a score of one seven, one five, one seven, and one six, for a total of 25 out of 40.

The Sydney Morning Herald gave the PS2 version a score of four stars out of five and stated, "Scoring a drop goal can be the trickiest move in the game, simply because the camera angle makes it difficult to line up. Whilst the game tends to be annoyingly accurate on higher settings, just persuade a friend to play to even up the challenge."  The Times also gave the game a score of four stars out of five and said that "Rugby, with its elaborate set-pieces and impenetrable laws, is a hard game to render on computer, but this is an extremely good try." The A.V. Club gave the PS2 and Xbox versions a B, saying that the game "isn't as pretty as the bigger EA Sports games, but it isn't as larded down with excess crap, either; just lots of teams, lots of tournaments, and what we'll assume are famous players in a good tough sport."

See also
 Rugby Challenge 2006

References

External links
 

2006 video games
PlayStation 2 games
Rugby union video games
Video games developed in Canada
Windows games
Xbox games
EA Sports games
Video games set in Argentina
Video games set in Australia
Video games set in France
Video games set in Ireland
Video games set in New Zealand
Video games set in South Africa
Video games set in the United Kingdom
HB Studios games